Calcutta and Burmah Steam Navigation Company (C&BSN) was formed in 1856 and was the immediate forerunner of British India Steam Navigation Company (BISN). The company was formed out of Mackinnon, Mackenzie & Co, a trading partnership of the Scots William Mackinnon and Robert Mackenzie, who had set up their business in Calcutta, India.

Calcutta and Burmah Steam Navigation was founded with initial capital of £35,000 to perform a mail contract,  which had been won from the Indian government, between Calcutta, Rangoon and Moulmein. The contract was renewed in 1862, when the service was extended to Singapore, and the same year its name was changed to British India SN Co. Robert Mackenzie had died in 1853, even before the company had been formed but William Mackinnon, who was chairman of the shipowning companies from the earliest years until his death in 1893, is considered the 'father' of the company. He was created baronet in 1889.

At the time of its inauguration and for many years afterwards, C&BSN and then BISN were supervised by Mackinnon, Mackenzie & Co as Managing Agents. This company acquired many trading interests during its life, including tea, jute and management of BI's coal mines in India.

External links
BI Ship (British India Steam Navigation) site

Companies established in 1856
Defunct shipping companies of India
Defunct transport companies of India